= Nipaniya Jat =

Nipaniya Jaat
- village
- Location within Madhya Pradesh Location within India
- Coordinates: 23.4019611°N 77.4042102°E
- Country: India
- State: Madhya Pradesh
- District: Bhopal
- Tehsil: Huzur
- Elevation: 487 m (1,598 ft)

Population (2011)
  - Total: 1,617
- Time zone: UTC+5:30 (IST)
- ISO 3166 code: MP-IN
- 2011 census code: 482396

Nipaniya Jat is a village in the Bhopal district of Madhya Pradesh, India. It is located in the Huzur tehsil and the Phanda block.

== Demographics ==
According to the 2011 census of India, Nipaniya Jat has 322 households. The effective literacy rate (i.e. the literacy rate of population excluding children aged 6 and below) is 74.06%.

Demographics (2011 Census)
	Total	Male	Female
Population	1617	832	785
Children aged below 6 years	264	144	120
Scheduled caste	430	211	219
Scheduled tribe	52	32	20
Literates	1002	568	434
Workers (all)	484	399	85
Main workers (total)	396	347	49
Main workers: Cultivators	153	142	11
Main workers: Agricultural labourers	128	112	16
Main workers: Household industry workers	17	15	2
Main workers: Other	98	78	20
Marginal workers (total)	88	52	36
Marginal workers: Cultivators	10	8	2
Marginal workers: Agricultural labourers	23	13	10
Marginal workers: Household industry workers	1	1	0
Marginal workers: Others	54	30	24
Non-workers	1133	433	700
